Renate Maria Dorrestein (25 January 1954 – 4 May 2018) was a Dutch writer, journalist and feminist.
She started working as a junior journalist for the Dutch magazines Libelle and Panorama. During the period 1977 - 1982 she published in Het Parool, Viva, Onkruid and Opzij. Dorrestein published her first novel (Buitenstaanders) in 1983. Her sister's suicide had a great influence on her books. Dorrestein won the Annie Romein prize in 1993 for her complete body of work. A lot of Dorrestein's books were translated, and they were sold in 14 countries.

In September 2017 Dorrestein publicly announced that she was suffering from esophageal cancer. She died on 4 May 2018 at the age of 64.

Bibliography
 1976 – Voorleesboek voor planten
 1983 – Buitenstaanders
 1985 – Vreemde streken
 1986 – Noorderzon
 1987 – Een nacht om te vliegeren
 1988 – Korte metten
 1988 – Het perpetuum mobile van de liefde
 1988 – Haar kop eraf. Alice als ideale heldin voor hedendaagse feministes (essay)
 1989 – Vóór alles een dame
 1991 – Het hemelse gerecht
 1992 – Katten en de kunst van het boekenonderhoud / Cats and the art of book maintenance
 1992 – Ontaarde moeders (translated into English as Unnatural mothers for the US)
 1993 – Heden ik
 1994 – Een sterke man
 1996 – Verborgen gebreken (translated into English as Crying shame for the UK and made into a film in 2004 (by Paula van der Oest)
 1997 – Het Tiende Inzicht
 1997 – Want dit is mijn lichaam ("Boekenweekgeschenk")
 1998 – Een hart van steen (translated into English as A heart of stone for the US and the UK)
 1999 – Voor Liefde klik op F (short story)
 2000 – Het geheim van de schrijver
 2001 – Zonder genade (translated into English as Without mercy for the US and the UK)
 2003 – Het duister dat ons scheidt
 2004 – Zolang er leven is
 2006 – Mijn zoon heeft een seksleven en ik lees mijn moeder Roodkapje voor
 2007 – Echt sexy
 2008 – Laat me niet alleen
 2009 – Is er hoop
 2009 – Heiligenlevens en bananenpitten
 2010 – De leesclub
 2011 – Pas goed op jezelf  (novella, also available as audiobook, written while writer in residence with the Vrije Universiteit Amsterdam)
 2011 – De stiefmoeder
 2012 – De zondagmiddagauto
 2013 – De blokkade
 2013 – Nott Won't Sleep (iPad game for toddlers about sleeping)
 2014 – Liever horen we onszelf (audiobook)
 2015 – Weerwater
 2015 – Penvriendin in China: Hoe ik dacht een dissident te helpen
 2016 – Zeven soorten honger
 2017 – Reddende engel
 2017 – Liever horen we onszelf (reissue of the audiobook from 2014)
 2018 – Dagelijks werk - een schrijversleven ("literary autobiography" with various texts written by Dorrestein in the course of her life, some of them published before, with a newly added introduction for each. )

References

External links
 

1954 births
2018 deaths
Dutch feminists
Dutch journalists
Dutch women writers
Feminist writers
Writers from Amsterdam
International Writing Program alumni
Deaths from esophageal cancer
Deaths from cancer in the Netherlands